Marc Ostfield is an American academic and diplomat who has served as United States ambassador to Paraguay since March 2022.

Education 

Ostfield earned a Bachelor of Arts in women's studies, a Master of Science in human sexuality education, and a Doctor of Philosophy in communication from the University of Pennsylvania.

Career 

Ostfield began his career as a curriculum supervisor at GMHC in 1987. In 1988 and 1989, he was the director of health education at New York University. From 1989 to 1993, he was a director at FHI 360. Ostfield worked as an independent consultant from 1995 to 2002 before joining the United States Department of State, first serving as a senior advisor in the Office of International Health and Biodefense. In 2009, he served as a senior foreign affairs advisor in the Office of Science and Technology Cooperation. From 2009 to 2013, he served as director of the Office of Policy and Global Issues in the Bureau of European and Eurasian Affairs. From 2013 to 2017, he was deputy director of the Foreign Service Institute. In 2017 and 2018, he served as acting director of the FSI.  In 2018, he became ombudsman of the Department of State.

Ambassador to Paraguay
On June 15, 2021, President Joe Biden nominated Ostfield to be the next United States Ambassador to Paraguay. On June 23, 2021, his nomination was sent to the Senate. On August 5, 2021, a hearing on his nomination was held before the Senate Foreign Relations Committee. On October 19, 2021, his nomination was reported favorably out of committee. On December 18, 2021, the United States Senate confirmed him by a voice vote. He presented his credentials to President of Paraguay Mario Abdo Benítez on March 9, 2022.

Personal life
Ostfield speaks French, Spanish, Portuguese, and Arabic.

References 

Living people
Ambassadors of the United States to Paraguay
New York University faculty
United States Department of State officials
University of Pennsylvania alumni
University of Pennsylvania Graduate School of Education alumni
Year of birth missing (living people)
21st-century American diplomats
LGBT ambassadors of the United States